Allium massaessylum is a Western Mediterranean species of wild onion native to Spain, Portugal, Morocco, and Algeria.

References

External links

massaessylum
Onions
Plants described in 1753
Taxa named by Carl Linnaeus